Metallothionein-1A is a protein that in humans is encoded by the MT1A gene.

References

Further reading

Human proteins